Carson is an unincorporated community in Prince George County, Virginia, United States, located between Petersburg and Stony Creek, just west of Interstate 95.

The community is divided between Prince George and Dinwiddie Counties along the former Petersburg Railroad railroad line, which was acquired by Atlantic Coast Line Railroad of Virginia and is now part of the CSX North End Subdivision.

References

External links
Atlantic Coast Line Railroad Depot; Carson, Virginia (Dynamic Depot Maps)

Unincorporated communities in Virginia
Unincorporated communities in Dinwiddie County, Virginia
Unincorporated communities in Prince George County, Virginia